Bøyabreen is a glacier in the Fjærland area of Sogndal Municipality in Vestland county, Norway. 
It is located inside Jostedalsbreen National Park, and it is a side branch of the large Jostedalsbreen glacier.

See also
List of glaciers in Norway

References

Glaciers of Vestland
Sogndal